Pokhara Thunders is a Nepali professional franchise football club based Pokhara. The club competes in the Nepal Super League, the top flight football league in Nepal.

History
The club was formed in March 2021 after the establishment of Nepal Super League the first ever franchise football league in Nepal, under the supervision of All Nepal Football Association (ANFA). The club played their first match on 25 April 2021 against Butwal Lumbini F.C.

2021 squad

2021 squad

Head coaching record

Technical staff

Team position by years
NSL, 2021: 5th

References

2020–21 in Nepalese football
Association football clubs established in 2021
2021 establishments in Nepal
Nepal Super League
Football clubs in Nepal